La Croix de la Grise is a monument atop an  hill in Havinnes, in the hills near Tournai, Belgium. It was put up in 1961 by Gabriel Dusquene de la Vinelle, leader of the French Resistance at Tournai during World War II.

References

Monuments and memorials in Belgium
Buildings and structures in Hainaut (province)
Tournai

fr:Croix de la grise